The Aqua Luna, known in Cantonese as the Cheung Po Tsai (張保仔), is a Chinese Junk operating in Victoria Harbour, Hong Kong. It was launched in 2006, and while it is named the Aqua Luna in English, in Cantonese it is named after the 19th-century Chinese pirate Cheung Po Tsai.

Construction
The Aqua Luna was built from scratch; it took a Hong Kong craftsman 18 months to construct using traditional shipbuilding methods under the supervision of a 73-year-old shipbuilder. It is owned by the Aqua Restaurant Group, and was launched in 2006 with a party on top of a building at Pier Four, in Hong Kong. It has two decks which offer  with an upper deck cabin with sofas and a lower deck saloon. The ship can accommodate 80 passengers in addition to the crew. However, the sails are purely decorative, and the barge is motorised. It costs up to HK$80,000 to rent.

Use
The ship is used for pleasure cruises around Victoria Harbour, Hong Kong, with stops at Tsim Sha Tsui, Central, Wan Chai and Hung Hom during the day and Central and Tsim Sha Tsue in the evening. It is also used for day tours to Stanley on weekends, as well as Aberdeen, Cheung Chau Island and Joss House Bay since 2011. It has featured in magazines, on postcards, and in Hong Kong TV shows. In 2011, to mark World Aids Day, the ship was used by Aids Concern for a "Sail in Red" day; students from Li Po Chun United World College were invited aboard and talks were given about the disease.  Above & Beyond (group) played their deep warm up set for ABGT300 on 28 September 2018 with family, friends and crew in attendance.

See also 
 Duk Ling

References

External links
 Aqua Luna Website

Ships of China
Boat types
Ships built in Hong Kong
Water transport in Hong Kong